"Killer" is a song by the American hard rock band Kiss. Featured on their 1982 album, Creatures of the Night, the song was released as an A-side single in the United Kingdom. Although "I Love It Loud" was an A-side single in the United States, it would be relegated to the B-side in the UK. It was the first song Vinnie Vincent and Gene Simmons wrote together after the two had met. In addition to not being able to chart at all, Kiss has never performed the song live and it has only been released as a single and on all issues of the Creatures of the Night album (the song was switched places with "Saint and Sinner" on the 1985 reissue).

Personnel
Gene Simmons – lead vocals, bass
Eric Carr – drums, backing vocals
Vinnie Vincent – lead guitar

References

Kiss (band) songs
1982 singles
Songs written by Gene Simmons
Songs written by Vinnie Vincent
1982 songs
Casablanca Records singles